Krasnye Chetai (Hĕrlĕ Çutay) is a rural locality (a selo) and the administrative center of Krasnochetaysky District of the Chuvash Republic, Russia. Population:

References

Notes

Sources

Rural localities in Chuvashia
Populated places established in 1582
Kurmyshsky Uyezd